Blastobasis molinda is a moth in the family Blastobasidae. It is found in India.

The larvae have been recorded feeding within the seeds of Shorea robusta.

References

Moths described in 1925
Blastobasis
Moths of Asia